Alexandre Lambert de Soyrier (3 April 1632 – 28 September 1706) was a Roman Catholic prelate who served as Bishop of Ivrea (1698–1706) and Bishop of Aosta (1692–1698).

Biography
Lambert was born in Chambery.
On 25 June 1692, he was appointed during the papacy of Pope Innocent XII as Bishop of Aosta.
On 30 June 1692, he was consecrated bishop by Fabrizio Spada, Cardinal-Priest of San Crisogono with Michelangelo Mattei, Titular Archbishop of Hadrianopolis in Haemimonto, and Baldassare Cenci (seniore), Titular Archbishop of Larissa in Thessalia, serving as co-consecrators. 
On 24 November 1698, he was appointed during the papacy of Pope Innocent XII as Bishop of Ivrea.
He served as Bishop of Ivrea until his death on 28 September 1706.

While bishop, he was the principal co-consecrator of Giovanni Fontana, Bishop of Cesena (1697); and Giuseppe Antonio Bertodano, Bishop of Vercelli (1697).

References

External links and additional sources
 (for Chronology of Bishops) 
 (for Chronology of Bishops)  
 (for Chronology of Bishops) 
 (for Chronology of Bishops)  

17th-century Italian Roman Catholic bishops
18th-century Italian Roman Catholic bishops
Bishops appointed by Pope Innocent XII
Bishops of Aosta
1632 births
1706 deaths